Actrices (Actresses) is a French comedy-drama film directed by Valeria Bruni Tedeschi, released in 2007. The film was presented in the official selection at the 60th Cannes Film Festival and won a Prix Spécial du Jury in the Un Certain Regard section.

Plot
Marcelline is a chagrined actress, haunted by Natalia Petrovna, the heroine of the Turgenev play A Month in the Country, that she is rehearsing. Trying to escape her fears she visits the swimming pool. While she is swimming she listens to Glenn Miller.

At the age of 40 she is unmarried and lives only for her work at the theatre. When she learns she will probably never have children, this heightens her anguish. She tries to communicate with those around her - living or dead: the Virgin Mary, the protecting ghost of her father seated on the family sofa, the mischievous phantom of her lover perched in a tree.  She laughs and cries in turn, a nothing perturbs her, a look from her mother, or simply a kiss from the young lead in the play she is acting in.

Cast 
 Valeria Bruni Tedeschi as Marcelline 
 Noémie Lvovsky as Nathalie 
 Louis Garrel as Éric 
 Mathieu Amalric as Denis 
 Valeria Golino as Nathalia Petrovna
 Marisa Borini as The mother
 Maurice Garrel as The father
 Simona Marchini as The aunt
 Bernard Nissille as Jean-Paul
 Olivier Rabourdin as Marc
 Laetitia Spigarelli as Juliett
 Gilles Cohen as Jean-Luc
 Marie Rivière as The tailoress
 Eric Elmosnino as Raymond
 Robinson Stévenin as Julien
 Laurent Grévill as Arthur
 Pascal Bongard as The priest

References

External links

2007 films
Films directed by Valeria Bruni Tedeschi
French comedy-drama films
2007 comedy-drama films
2000s French-language films
2000s French films